This is a list of the Arkansas state high school football champions which have been sanctioned by the Arkansas Activities Association (AAA).

List of Arkansas state high school football champions 

♦ Denotes winners of High School Football National Championship

Starting in 1968, the Arkansas Activities Association organized playoffs to determine a state champion in each school size classification.

 1967 – FS Northside (9), Conway (2)
 1966 – LR Hall (3)-North Little Rock (2)-FS Northside (8)
 1965 – North Little Rock 
 1964 – LR Hall (2), Conway 
 1963 – Pine Bluff (16)
 1962 – Pine Bluff (15)
 1961 – FS Northside (7)
 1960 – LR Central (23), AP/UP media AA champion Stuttgart.
 1959 – LR Hall 
 1958 – El Dorado (5)
 1957 – LR Central (22) ♦ (12–0)
 1956 – Little Rock (21)
 1955 – Little Rock (20)
 1954 – Little Rock (19)
 1953 – Little Rock (18)
 1952 – Little Rock (17)-Camden (2), Stuttgart (2), Earle 
 1951 – Pine Bluff (14)
 1950 – Little Rock (16), Blytheville (7), Wynne, Rison 
 1949 – Little Rock (15), Smackover, Stuttgart, Lake Village (2)
 1948 – Blytheville (6), Paragould, Lake Village 
 1947 – Little Rock (14), Magnolia, Dermott 
 1946 – Little Rock (13)♦ (14–0)
 1945 – Fort Smith (6), Texarkana
 1944 – Little Rock (12)
 1943 – Pine Bluff (13)
 1942 – El Dorado (4)
 1941 – Blytheville (5)
 1940 – Blytheville (4)
 1939 – Pine Bluff (12) ♦ (11–0–1)
 1938 – Little Rock (11)
 1937 – Pine Bluff (11)
 1936 – Blytheville (3)
 1935 – Pine Bluff (10), Blytheville (2)
 1934 – Hot Springs, Blytheville, De Queen 
 1933 – El Dorado (3), Russellville, Searcy 
 1932 – Pine Bluff (9), El Dorado (2), Fort Smith (5)
 1931 – Fort Smith (4), Camden 
 1930 – Van Buren (2)
 1929 – Pine Bluff (8)
 1928 – Pine Bluff (7)
 1927 – Pine Bluff (6)
 1926 – Pine Bluff (5)
 1925 – Pine Bluff (4)♦ (16–0) 
 1924 – El Dorado
 1923 – Little Rock (4)
 1922 – Pine Bluff (3)
 1921 – Little Rock (10), Pine Bluff (2)
 1920 – Little Rock (9)
 1919 – Little Rock (8)
 1918 – Little Rock (7)
 1917 – Little Rock (6)
 1916 – Pine Bluff
 1915 – Little Rock (5)
 1914 – Little Rock (4)
 1913 – Fort Smith (3)
 1912 – Van Buren
 1911 – Fordyce Clary Training 
 1910 – Fort Smith (2)
 1909 – Little Rock (3)
 1908 – Little Rock (2)
 1907 – Little Rock
 1906 – Unknown 
 1905 – Fort Smith

Most state football championships

See also 

 Arkansas Activities Association
 List of Arkansas state high school soccer champions
 List of Arkansas state high school basketball champions
 List of Arkansas state high school baseball champions
 List of Arkansas state high school swimming champions
 List of Arkansas state high school tennis champions
 List of Arkansas state high school track and field champions

Notes

References

External links 
 Arkansas Activities Association: Football

high school champions
Football champions, List of Arkansas state
Arkansas state high school football champions, List of